Gorica na Medvedjeku is a small village in the Municipality of Trebnje in eastern Slovenia. The area is part of the historical region of Lower Carniola. The municipality is now included in the Southeast Slovenia Statistical Region.

History
Gorica na Medvedjeku was established as an independent settlement in 2013, when it was separated from Martinja Vas.

References

External links
Gorica na Medvedjeku at Geopedia

Populated places in the Municipality of Trebnje
Populated places established in 2013